Nikolay Novikov (1744 – 1818) was a Russian writer.

Nikolay Novikov may also refer to:

 Nikolai Vasilevich Novikov (1903 – 1989), Soviet diplomat
 Nikolay Novikov (boxer) (born 1946), Russian boxer